Tabarca, officially Nueva Tabarca and also known as Isla Plana (Spanish) and  as Nova Tabarca and Illa Plana in Valencian, is an islet located in the Mediterranean Sea, close to the town of Santa Pola, in the province of Alicante, Valencian community, Spain. Tabarca is the largest island in the Valencian Community, and the smallest permanently inhabited islet in Spain. It is known for its marine reserve.

History
Before 1700, the island was known as Illa de Sant Pau ('Saint Paul's Island') or Illa Plana ('Flat Island'). Believed to be the island that St. Paul disembarked on, the island was a refuge for Barbary pirates up to the end of the 18th century and used as a base for raids on the Levantine coast.

The island's current namesake is a Tunisian islet and town of Tabarka, which was a part of the Republic of Genoa until it was conquered by the Bey of Tunis in 1741. In 1760, Charles III of Spain ordered the fortification and repopulation of the Spanish island. A group of Genoese sailors who had been shipwrecked near the Tunisian Tabarka were rescued and settled here. 

On their arrival, the Genoese were first moved to Alicante, where they lived temporarily in the Jesuit School, which was empty after the expulsion of the Jesuits from Spain. Eventually, the Genoese were moved to the island, together with a Spanish garrison. The military engineer Fernando Méndez Ras planned a fortified town and walls, bulwarks, warehouses and barracks were built. From 1770, the island was renamed Nova Tabarca ("New Tabarca" in both Valencian and Latin).

Although the Genoese assimilated, abandoning their language in favor of Valencian and, later, Spanish (both languages are currently spoken on the islet), the Genoese descent of the settlers can still be found in the surnames of Italian origin common on the islet.

The island is twinned with Carloforte, in the Sardinian San Pietro Island, which was also populated with Genoese from Tunisian Tabarka.

The gateways are still visible and so are the Governor's House (currently a hotel) and the church of St Peter and St Paul, concluded in 1779.

In 1850, the governor and the garrison were removed. At the end of the 19th century, the island had a population of around 1,000 people mainly devoted to fishing. In the early 21st century, the permanent population was around 50, making Tabarca the smallest permanently inhabited Spanish island (although this number is multiplied by ten during the tourist season in summer).

The main activity of the local population is fishing, with the catch brought to Santa Pola's fish market, but tourism becomes the most important resource during summer, especially in July and August.

Geography
Despite being more related to the fishing port of Santa Pola, both socially and economically, the tiny island of Tabarca is a part of the city of Alicante. Administratively, it is managed as a rural district of Alicante, jointly with el Palmeral, Aiguamarga and Urbanova.

The local census (2011) counted 68 inhabitants. The postal code is 03138.

Almost next to the main islet lie the islets of la Nau, la Galera and la Cantera.

Tourism is the main economical activity, especially during the summer. There are several boats connecting Tabarca with Alicante, Santa Pola and Torrevieja, with higher frequencies during summer time.

Tabarca has a semi-arid climate similar to the climate found in the city of Alicante, with scarce rainfall, which is under  on average. Although compared to Alicante, the average temperatures are milder (both highs and lows) as well as the extreme temperatures are milder, since the temperatures are heavily influenced by the location of the island in the Mediterranean Sea. In a normal year, the maximum temperatures don't go above  during summers or under  during winters.

Ecology

Tabarca is a protected marine reserve called Reserva marina de la Isla de Tabarca, with a variety of marine fauna including sea bass, grouper, conger eel, and gilthead, and was declared a Zone of Special Protection for Birds by the EU. It is surrounded by very clear and unpolluted waters. The island is formed by materials of volcanic origin on top of which limestone and quaternary deposits have settled.

Tabarca was the last Spanish Mediterranean location where the critically endangered Mediterranean monk seal successfully bred before it became extinct in this part of its range in the 1960s. This proves the high quality of the waters around the island in terms of marine ecology. Therefore, waters around Tabarca were declared a marine reserve in 1986, the first of its kind in Spain. This status was mainly granted due to its submarine posidonia prairie, which is the largest in the Spanish Mediterranean and has an extraordinary ecological value in terms of marine fauna and flora.

In order to both enhance the marine biodiversity and protect it from fishing, an artificial reef was laid near the island by the Marine Reserve authorities.

See also
 Calasetta
 La Herradura

References

External links 

 Tabarca en Google Maps
 Official site of the Spanish Marine Reservations, including Tabarca (in Spanish).
 Tabarca insights, including details about the local food.
Detailed site from the Alicante city council about Tabarca (in Spanish).

Province of Alicante
Tabarca, island of
Marine reserves of Spain
Utopian communities
Populated places established in 1760
Landforms of the Valencian Community